is one of 24 wards of Osaka in Japan.

Incidents and accidents 
2021 Osaka building fire

Notable locations
Kita-ku, particularly the Umeda area surrounding Osaka Station, is one of the main commercial centers of Osaka. Kita-ku is also a financial administration center, housing the headquarters of the Japan Mint and the Osaka branch of the Bank of Japan.

Firms headquartered in Kita-ku
Daicel
Daikin (Umeda Center Building)
Daiwa House
FM802
Hankyu Hanshin Holdings
Hankyu Railway
Kansai Electric Power Company
Kansai Telecasting Corporation
Kaneka Corporation
Mainichi Broadcasting System
Nihon Bussan
Nippon Paint
Nipro
Oh-Ebashi LPC & Partners
Santen Pharmaceutical
Suntory
Toyobo
West Japan Railway Company
West Nippon Expressway Company (Dojima Avanza)
Yanmar (Umeda Gate Tower)
Zojirushi

Asahi Kasei, Itochu Corporation, Kuraray and Kaneka Corporation each have "headquarters" in both Kita-ku and in Tokyo.

Firms with branch offices in Kita-ku
Dentsu and Yomiuri Shimbun have branch offices in Kita-ku. Mazda has an office in the Umeda Sky Building Tower East. Air France has an office on the third and sixth floors of the Shin-Sakurabashi Building in Umeda. The office handles Aircalin-related inquiries. Google has an office in the Hankyu Grand Building in Kita-ku. Bandai Visual's Kansai Office opened in Kita-ku in March 1988; the division is now known as the Osaka Branch. Japan Airlines at one time operated a ticketing facility on the first floor of the Daiichi Seimei Building in Umeda, Kita-ku.

Diplomatic missions
The Consulate-General of the United States in Osaka is located in Kita-ku. The Consulate-General of Belgium in Osaka is located on the twelfth floor of the Snow Crystal Building in Umeda, Kita-ku. The Consulate-General of Germany in Osaka is located on the thirty-fifth floor of the Umeda Sky Building Tower East in Kita-ku. The Consulate-General of Italy in Osaka is located since April 2013 on the 17th floor of the Nakanoshima Festival Tower in Nakanoshima.

Landmarks

Umeda downtown

Commercial and business centre of Kansai region with many high-rise buildings and large underground complexes.

Nakanoshima island

Government facilities and museums, and office buildings is situated on this island. Notable establishments is City hall, Central Public Hall, Bank of Japan Osaka branch and Osaka International Convention Center.
National Museum of Art, Osaka and Osaka Science Museum is also in this island.

Parks
Nakanoshima Park
Yodogawa riverside park and Kema-Sakuranomiya Park
Ohgimachi Park
Ogimachi Kids Park (Kids Plaza Osaka)
Sakuranomiya Park
Minami-Temma Park
Umeada Umekita Gardens

Shrine and Temple
Kokubun-ji (Osaka)
Osaka Temmangu Shrine

Others
Tenjimbashisuji Shōtengai (the longest covered shopping street in Japan)
Festival Hall
The South Korean government maintains the Korea Education Institution in Kita-ku.

Department stores
Hanshin Department Store
Hankyu Department Store
Daimaru Umeda-mise

Mass media

Newspapers
Mainichi Shimbun Osaka Office – Umeda
Yomiuri Shimbun Osaka Office – Nozakicho
Asahi Shimbun Osaka Office – Nakanoshima

Broadcasting stations
Mainichi Broadcasting System (MBS) – Chayamachi, TV and radio
Asahi Broadcasting Corporation (ABC) – Oyodo-minami, TV and radio
Kansai TV – Ogimachi, TV

Education

International schools:
 Osaka YMCA International School

Railway stations

Terminals:
Osaka Station (JR West)
Umeda Station (Hankyu, Hanshin, Osaka Subway)
Yodoyabashi Station (Keihan, Osaka Subway)

The following stations are also connected to Osaka and Umeda by underground passageways:
Kitashinchi Station (JR West)
Higashi-Umeda Station (Osaka Subway)
Nishi-Umeda Station (Osaka Subway)

Other stations in Kita-ku:
Minami-morimachi Station (Osaka Subway)
Nakatsu Station (Hankyu)
Nakatsu Station (Osaka Subway)
Nakazakicho Station (Osaka Subway)
Ogimachi Station (Osaka Subway)
Osaka-Temmangu Station (JR West)
Tenjimbashisuji Rokuchōme Station (Hankyu, Osaka Subway)
Temma Station (JR West)

Notable people from Kita-ku, Osaka 
 Etsuko Inada – Japanese figure skater 
 Kagaku Murakami – Japanese painter and illustrator
 Kenta Kiritani – Japanese actor and singer
 Tetsuji Takechi – Japanese theatrical and film director, critic, and author

References

External links

 
 

 
Wards of Osaka